Meloni is an Italian surname. Notable people with the name include:

People

Arts and entertainment
Christopher Meloni (born 1961), American actor
Claude Méloni (born 1940), French baritone 
Marco Meloni, Italian Renaissance painter
Roberto Meloni (singer) (born 1977), Italian singer

Politics
Assunta Meloni (born 1951), Sammarinese politician
Giorgia Meloni (born 1977), prime minister of Italy

Sport
Eugenio Meloni (born 1994), Italian athlete, high jump specialist
Franco Meloni, Italian racing driver
Giordano Meloni (born 1983), Italian footballer (plays for Flaminia Civita Castellana)
Marcus Meloni (born 2000), Brazilian footballer (plays for Sharjah)
Roberto Meloni (born 1981), Italian judoka

Fictional characters 
Meloni Thawne,  fictional character in the DC Comics Universe, and the mother of the superhero Impulse

Italian-language surnames